Nick Craddock FRCPsych FMedSci is a British psychiatrist, the Director of the National Centre for Mental Health and Professor of Psychiatry at Cardiff University in Wales. He specialises in  the diagnosis and management of mood and psychotic illness. His interests include  psychiatric genetics and genome-wide association studies.

He  graduated from Birmingham University with a degree in medicine in 1985. He   is   a Fellow of the Academy of Medical Sciences,   Fellow and Honorary Treasurer of the Royal College of Psychiatrists, and  Past President of the International Society of Psychiatric Genetics. He is Scientific Advisor to Bipolar UK.

Craddock was awarded the Stromgren medal for psychiatric research in 2011, and  the honorary degree of Doctor of Medicine (MD) by Birmingham University in 2014.

References

Alumni of the University of Birmingham
Living people
British psychiatrists
Academics of Cardiff University
20th-century English medical doctors
21st-century English medical doctors
Year of birth missing (living people)